
The following is a list of Playboy Playmates of 2013. Playboy magazine names their Playmate of the Month each month throughout the year.

January

Karina Marie (born February 5, 1984)  is the Playboy Playmate of the Month for January 2013. Her centerfold was photographed by Sasha Eisenman. She is the fourteenth British Playmate.

February

Shawn Michelle Dillon (born June 7, 1986) is the Playboy Playmate of the Month for February 2013. Her centerfold was photographed by Tony Kelly.

March

Ashley Doris Wilson (born November 1, 1989) is the Playboy Playmate of the Month for March 2013. Her centerfold was photographed by Sasha Eisenman and she is the first Playmate from Connecticut.

April

Jaslyn Renee Ome (born July 21, 1991) is the Playboy Playmate of the Month for April 2013. Hers was the last centerfold photographed by Stephen Wayda.  Ome is of East Indian, African-American, and Caucasian descent. Ome graduated from Oak Ridge High school in 2009 and went on to Sacramento State University and Folsom Lake College to study communications.

May

Kristen Nicole Sanne (born November 15, 1989) is the Playboy Playmate of the Month for May 2013. Her centerfold was photographed by Josh Ryan.

June

Audrey Aleen Allen (born April 8, 1991) (also known as Audrey Andelise) is the Playboy Playmate of the Month for June 2013. Her centerfold was photographed by Sasha Eisenman. She also has a sister, Anna Karina Allen (known as Anna Andelise), who is also a model and had auditioned for Playboy with her.

July

Alyssa Arcè (born February 27, 1992) is the Playboy Playmate of the Month for July 2013. Her centerfold was photographed by Sasha Eisenmann.

August

Valerie Keil (born January 4, 1991) is the Playboy Playmate of the Month for August 2013. Her centerfold was photographed by Josh Ryan. Since her pictorial she has appeared on the crime drama series CSI.

September

Bryiana Noelle Flores (born July 21, 1991) is the Playboy Playmate of the Month for September 2013. Her centerfold was photographed by Josh Ryan.

October

Carly Lauren (born July 3, 1990) is the Playboy Playmate of the Month for October 2013. Her centerfold was photographed by Josh Ryan. Lauren has appeared on television shows including Suburgatory and Rules of Engagement.

November

Gemma Lee Farrell (born January 15, 1988) is the Playboy Playmate of the Month for November 2013 and the first "Kiwi" Playmate, a New Zealander. Her centerfold was photographed by Sasha Eisenmann. After reaching 420,000 followers on Instagram, Farrell featured as the "Instagram Girl of the Week" on Maxim magazine's website.

December

Kennedy Summers (born March 3, 1987) is the Playboy Playmate of the Month for December 2013 and the Playboy Playmate of the Year for 2014. Her centerfold was shot by Josh Ryan.

See also
 List of people in Playboy 2010–2019

References

 2013
Playmates of 2013
2013-related lists